Spot "Spotty" Fetcher (March 17, 1989 – February 21, 2004) was U.S. President George W. Bush's dog. She was an English Springer Spaniel, named after Scott Fletcher, a baseball player with the Major League Baseball team Texas Rangers, a team George W. Bush owned before becoming Governor of Texas in 1994.

Born in the White House, she was the daughter of Millie, who had belonged to President George H. W. Bush and First Lady Barbara Bush. Her father was Tug Farish from Lane's End Farm in Kentucky, better known for its thoroughbred horse breeding program.

She was euthanized after suffering a series of strokes. She was 14 years old.

Spot is the only presidential pet to have lived in the White House under two presidents, the two being George H. W. Bush and his son, George W. Bush.

George had a dog at the time of her death, Barney, who became a popular figure for the US, and later another dog, Miss Beazley, who was born eight months after Spots death.

See also
United States presidential pets
List of individual dogs

References

External links
 Whitehouse.gov biography of Spot Fetcher (archived at the Internet Archive)

1989 animal births
2004 animal deaths
George W. Bush
United States presidential dogs